Elwin Elton "Tiny" Feather (February 23, 1902 – July 15, 1965) was a professional American football player who played running back for eight seasons for the Cleveland Bulldogs, Detroit Wolverines, New York Giants, Staten Island Stapletons, and Cincinnati Reds.

References 

1902 births
1965 deaths
People from Ottawa County, Kansas
Players of American football from Kansas
American football running backs
Kansas State Wildcats football players
Cleveland Bulldogs players
New York Giants players
Staten Island Stapletons players
Cincinnati Reds (NFL) players